The PG Era is an era of professional wrestling within World Wrestling Entertainment, Inc. (WWE), which began on July 22, 2008 after its programming received a TV-PG rating from the TV Parental Guidelines. Doing business as World Wrestling Entertainment at the time, the company ceased using its full name in reference to the wrestling promotion in April 2011, and strictly started going by the "WWE" abbreviation, which became an orphaned initialism.

WWE instituted a number of changes as they began marketing to a younger audience, such as heavily scripting on-screen promos and toning down excessive violence, profanity and sexual content. The earlier parts of the era were defined by superhero-esque fan-favorites and one-dimensional villains. While WWE considers the era to have ended in either 2013 or 2014 in favor of a more reality-based era, some describe the PG Era as ongoing since the 2008 changes continue to remain in effect. The PG Era has received much criticism from fans due to its watered-down violence and family-friendly program and characters, but it has also been praised as a good business decision as it made the promotion more appealing to a wider audience and corporate sponsors.

Background
Prior to 1997, WWF (WWE was known as the World Wrestling Federation until 2002) programming was rated TV-PG. Raw shifted to a TV-14 rating in 1997 amidst direct competition with World Championship Wrestling's (WCW) flagship show Nitro during the Monday Night Wars. It remained with that rating until 2008. SmackDown has been rated TV-PG since its inception in 1999.

WWE promoter Vince McMahon states that the Attitude Era of the late 1990s and early 2000s was the result of competition from WCW and forced the company to "go for the jugular". Due to WCW's demise in 2001, McMahon says that they "don't have to" appeal to viewers in the same way and that during the "far more scripted" PG Era, WWE could "give the audience what they want in a far more sophisticated way". WWE says that the move to PG cut the "excess" of the Attitude Era and "ushered in a new era of refined and compelling storytelling". John Cena was face of the company during this time, despite receiving a mixed reception from the audience.

While WWE had been slowly moving towards a more family-friendly format before it, Vice News writes that this was accelerated after the Chris Benoit double murder and suicide in 2007. Then-WWE CEO Linda McMahon described the transition away from TV-14 as a "cradle to the grave" approach to appeal to younger viewers and encourage brand loyalty. Bryan Alvarez and Lance Storm of Wrestling Observer Newsletter attribute the move to TV-PG as a result of WWE appealing to sponsors, which was confirmed by former WWE chief marketing officer Michelle Wilson.

WWE officially announced the move to TV-PG on July 22, 2008. The 2008 SummerSlam pay-per-view (PPV) was the first WWE PPV to carry the TV-PG rating. To appeal to younger fans, WWE released the WWE Kids magazine in 2008, and debuted the kid-friendly Saturday Morning Slam television program in 2012. In 2013, WWE reported that their revenue had "nearly tripled" since the move to TV-PG, due to corporate partnerships from companies such as Mattel and Post Cereals. However, the PG Era occurred during a time of gradually declining Nielsen ratings, which had begun after the demise of WCW but accelerated after Raw went to a three-hour format in 2012.

Changes in content

As WWE reverted to a more family-friendly style, previous staples in their programming were altered or dropped. Use of profanity was toned down. An example of this was when John Cena renamed his finishing maneuver from "FU" to "Attitude Adjustment" or the PPV event WWE One Night Stand changing the name to WWE Extreme Rules to avoid the sexual connotations. Female wrestlers had previously performed in Bra and panties matches and several of them had posed nude in Playboy but these were dropped in 2008. Excessive violence was also toned down. Chair shots to the head became increasingly rare after Chris Benoit's death, and were completely banned in 2010. In 2011 following their match at WrestleMania XXVII, wrestlers The Undertaker and Triple H were fined for chair shots to the head, despite the match being well received by the fans. Also in April 2011, the company ceased going by its full name in reference to the wrestling promotion, strictly only using the "WWE" abbreviation, which became an orphaned initialism; the company's legal name, however, remains World Wrestling Entertainment.

Amid declining ratings and the launch of rival promotion All Elite Wrestling (AEW) in 2019, it was reported that WWE wanted to move on from PG-style content. Vince McMahon acknowledged that the promotion would be "a bit edgier, but remain in the PG environment." He said the promotion had "graduated from ... gory crap" and was "a more sophisticated product."

Major storylines and stars

WWE considers the PG Era to have ended in either 2013 or 2014, in favor of The Reality Era, although the exact duration of the era is disputed. Many sources continue to describe WWE as still being in the PG Era because most of their content is still rated TV-PG.{{efn|name=disputed|Various sources have described the PG Era as being active past 2014, including: The Denver Post in 2015, Bleacher Report in 2018, Dave Meltzer and Súper Luchas in 2019, Fightful in 2020, and CinemaBlend in 2021.}} For the purposes of this article, only events between 2008–2014 will be covered in the section.

Bleacher Report states that "Perhaps the most distinguishable characteristic of WWE's PG Era was its reliance on superhero-esque babyfaces." While John Cena was the biggest star in the company at that time, other major stars during that period included established holdovers (or returning performers) from prior WWE eras, including Chris Jericho, Randy Orton, Rey Mysterio, Batista, Edge, Christian, and Jeff Hardy. The heroic characters were often placed against villains such as Dolph Ziggler, Jack Swagger, Mark Henry, Big Show, and The Miz. Older Attitude Era alumni like The Undertaker, Triple H, and Shawn Michaels continued to have prominent matches throughout this time, and The Rock and Brock Lesnar returned to face Cena. This era saw Batista's first departure in 2010, and Shawn Michaels and Edge retired in 2010 and 2011 respectively.

Women were not an integral part of the show and were treated as a sideshow during the early parts of the era, similar to how they were presented in the 1970s and '80s. However, AJ Lee and Paige were given greater prominence as time went on and paved the way for the "Divas Revolution" of 2015.

During the PG Era, Hardy won the WWE Championship for the first time at Armageddon 2008. His subsequent 2009 feud with CM Punk was described as "shockingly real" given the PG Era, as Punk referenced Hardy's real-life drug addiction. Their rivalry culminated in a match at SummerSlam, which Punk won, and Hardy subsequently left the promotion. CM Punk became a "megastar" in the summer of 2011 during his feud with Cena, the pinnacle of which saw him defeat Cena for the WWE Championship at Money in the Bank and SummerSlam respectively in two well-received matches. Dave Meltzer of the Wrestling Observer Newsletter awarded the John Cena–CM Punk main event match of Money in the Bank 2011 five stars out of five, the first WWE match since 1997 to receive such a rating.  Cena and Punk's match on the February 25, 2013 episode of Raw has also been named one of the greatest matches of all times. During his 2011 storyline with Cena, Punk performed a shoot promo (known as The Pipebomb), with a style far away from the PG content. Bleacher Report writes: "Punk turned the company on its head for a few short years and gave fans a taste of what an alternative to the advertiser-obsessed promotion could look like."

Future stars such as Alberto Del Rio, Daniel Bryan, Sheamus, Drew McIntyre, The Wyatt Family (Bray Wyatt, Luke Harper and Erick Rowan) and The Shield (Roman Reigns, Dean Ambrose, Seth Rollins) made their debuts during this time. The ECW brand was discontinued in 2010 and replaced with NXT, which serves as a developmental brand for the promotion. The Nexus (a stable initially started out by 7 original members of NXT) storyline was heavily featured between 2010–2011, with the decision for Cena to dominate the entire stable throughout its existence being heavily panned by critics.Grantland columnist David Shoemaker writes that while the path towards the Reality Era began with CM Punk's "insurrection", Brock Lesnar brought "a new era of wrestling legitimacy" when he returned in 2012. Lesnar's on-screen manager, Paul Heyman, referred to him as the "most non-PG ass kicker of the PG Era" and the violence in his return match with Cena at Extreme Rules 2012 caused the PPV to receive a TV-14 rating on iTunes. While WWE considers the Reality Era to have begun in 2014, Shoemaker writes that the Reality Era reached its apex with ascension of Daniel Bryan that year, but Comicbook.com considers the end of the PG Era to have happened when CM Punk left the company after Royal Rumble 2014 and Joe Nguyen of The Denver Post believes Seth Rollins' victory over Lesnar at WrestleMania 31 in 2015 ended the PG Era. It was during 2015 that John Cena slowly began to transition to a part time role and WWE began attempting to establish Roman Reigns as the face of the company, which received polarizing reception from fans and critics.

Reception

The move to TV-PG programming has been singled out as WWE's most controversial decision amongst wrestling fans. The transition to TV-PG caused some fans to support WWE's competitors, with Pro Wrestling Torch writer James Caldwell commenting that WWE's programming resembled children's shows such as Barney & Friends or Blue's Clues when compared to their nearest competitor's at the time, Total Nonstop Action Wrestling (TNA), which was promoting more adult-oriented content. Batista attributed his 2010 departure to the PG Era, and said that wrestling was "in a bad moment" during that time. Bryan Alvarez has been highly critical of WWE storylines throughout the period, but does not blame the TV-PG rating. Alvarez points out that much of the raunchy Attitude Era programming had a TV-PG rating, while viewership declined sharply after the Invasion storyline, which occurred while Raw had a TV-14 rating. 

Although noting that the move was unpopular with some fans, Chris Mueller of the Bleacher Report opined that it was the right thing to do given changing times, writing: "The world is more politically correct, parents are more cautious about what their kids are watching and advertisers are less willing to back controversial brands." Mueller praised the PG Era as a wise business decision because it made the promotion more appealing to corporate sponsors. Shortly after the transition, Miami Herald'' writer Jim Varsallone said that the changes in programming were too subtle for casual fans to notice and that he did not get complaints from fans. WWE Hall of Famer Ted DiBiase supported the move to TV-PG because he is a Christian pastor and did not enjoy the raunchier programming, while Hall of Famer Kurt Angle has praised the era as being "good for wrestling" due to non-television reasons such as the health of the wrestlers. Edge compared the PG Era favorably to the Attitude Era, stating that his matches were given more airtime during the PG Era as the latter was more "about the hijinks backstage" than in-ring action. The Miz said that the limitations of the PG Era made them more creative, while Triple H also defended it by emphasizing the importance of storylines over "special effects".

The transition to TV-PG became a subject of controversy during Linda McMahon's 2010 Senate campaign. US Senator Chris Dodd accused McMahon of trying to distance herself from professional wrestling, while Superstar Billy Graham said that the move to kid-friendly programming was done so that she would be a more appealing candidate. WWE denied these claims, stating that the 2008 transition to TV-PG occurred "long before McMahon announced her candidacy".

Notes

References

External links
Official WWE website

 
Television in the United States
2000s in American television
2010s in American television
2000s in professional wrestling
2010s in professional wrestling